Lesbian, gay, bisexual and transgender (LGBT) persons in Saint Vincent and the Grenadines face legal challenges not experienced by non-LGBT residents. The Penal Code makes same-sex acts illegal with a punishment up to 10 years in prison, although the law is not enforced and is being challenged in the courts. In addition, it outlaws the practice of "buggery" (which is anal and oral sex), whether homosexual or heterosexual and irrespective of whether the act was consensual. The country's laws also do not address discrimination or harassment on account of sexual orientation or gender identity, nor recognize same-sex unions in any form, whether it be marriage or partnerships. Households headed by same-sex couples are not eligible for any of the same rights given to opposite-sex married couples.

Legality of same-sex sexual activity 

Homosexuality is illegal in Saint Vincent and the Grenadines. Section 148 of the Criminal Code states that:

Section 146 of the 1990 Criminal Code states that: 

Being gender-neutral, the "buggery" law applies universally to both heterosexual and homosexual conduct. Various reports state that these laws are unenforced.

In May 2019, after being the victim of a transphobic attack in April 2019, a fraud charge against Leswan Stewart, a "cross-dressing gay" teen who was accused of defrauding a man by pretending to be a woman, was withdrawn by the prosecutor who gave no reason for the decision.

Decriminalisation efforts
In 2018, Human Rights Watch urged Saint Vincent and the Grenadines and other Eastern Caribbean countries to repeal colonial "buggery" laws. In September 2018, following physical attacks on three cross-dressing young men, Prime Minister Ralph Gonsalves said that it is unbecoming and wrong for anyone to physically assault a person based on any prejudice they may have due to his/her sexual orientation. He also condemned the incident and said that such irrational homophobia is entirely unacceptable, and called for an open conversation on homosexuality.

In July 2019, two gay men filed court proceedings to challenge the country's "buggery" and "gross indecency" laws. The two petitioners are unknown to each other. They are Javin Johnson, 22, who successfully claimed asylum in the United Kingdom in 2017, having established that he could not live as a gay man in Saint Vincent and the Grenadines, and Sean Macleish, 53, a Vincentian resident of Chicago in the United States. Macleish has publicly advocated to the Prime Minister for the removal of these laws so that he may return home with his partner, but to no effect. According to their affidavits, as a result of the legislation, they have been exiled from the Caribbean country due to the severely draconian and damaging effects of these laws. The two challenges are expected to be heard together in the High Court of Saint Vincent and the Grenadines in the capital Kingstown. The British Privy Council in London may have ultimate say on these laws.

Commenting on these legal challenges, the Prime Minister of Saint Vincent and the Grenadines, Ralph Gonsalves, said "whatever happens here (in St Vincent and the Grenadines), it would be an OECS (Organisation of Eastern Caribbean States) decision... so it would apply, because all the legal provisions the constitutional provisions are similar and the legislation is basically similar. And if the legislation is unconstitutional here... it would be unconstitutional in other member states".

Living conditions
LGBT life in Saint Vincent and the Grenadines is invisible and stigmatised. There are no associations or organisations dedicated to LGBT people, nor any sort of helpline or help centre for LGBT youth.

In September 2011, a same-sex couple went public with their relationship, writing a short article in the Vinci Kallaloo, entitled "Introduction: Not Easy Being Gay in St. Vincent and the Grenadines". The article received unprecedented attention, with over 3,400 hits in less than a day and over 50 comments, the third-highest of any article for the newspaper at the time. Several of the comments involved violent murderous threats (Saint Vincent and the Grenadines has one of the highest homicide rates in the world).

In 2011, three lecturers at the St. Vincent and the Grenadines Community College were the victims of an orchestrated scheme by the college's director, who accused them of having "homosexual tendencies". A posting in the Vinci Kallaloo accuses the director of starting the rumour in an effort to fire the lecturers and rid the college of any partisan opponents, as the lecturers were either supporters of the opposition New Democratic Party or had not expressed any particular political position.

Summary table

See also 

Human rights in Saint Vincent and the Grenadines
LGBT rights in the Americas

References

Saint Vincent and the Grenadines
Human rights in Saint Vincent and the Grenadines
Society of Saint Vincent and the Grenadines
Saint Vincent and the Grenadines